Martin Moors is a professor of Philosophy and is the Chair of Contemporary Metaphysics at the Higher Institute of Philosophy at the Catholic University of Leuven (KUL), Belgium, where he lectures.

He is internationally respected and highly regarded for his publications on Kant, German idealism and Schelling.

Books
Boros, Gábor, Herman De Dijn, and M. Moors. The Concept of Love in 17th and 18th Century Philosophy. [Leuven, Belgium]: Leuven University Press, 2007.

References

Year of birth missing (living people)
Living people
Université catholique de Louvain
Academic staff of KU Leuven